SVDK (Russian : СВДК, GRAU index 6V9) is a Russian precision rifle from the SVD rifle family chambered for the 9.3×64mm 7N33 cartridge.

Description 
The Dragunov SVDK large-caliber sniper rifle (any rifle caliber above 9 mm is considered a large caliber in Russia) is a somewhat controversial weapon, adopted by the Russian army in 2006. It was developed through "burglar" (Breaker) research and development program, along with 7.62 mm SV-98 sniper and 12.7 mm ASVK anti-materiel rifles. The purpose of SVDK is to deal with targets which are too hard for standard 7.62×54mmR sniper rifles like SV-98 or SVD, such as assault troops in heavy body armor or enemy snipers behind cover. There were also rumors that the SVDK will serve as a long-range anti-personnel weapon. The effective range of the SVDK is cited as 'about 600 meters'.

See also
 Dragunov SVD
 List of Russian weaponry
 OSV-96
 SV-98

References

External links

 Image

Sniper rifles of Russia
Semi-automatic rifles